Julián Ganzábal (born 25 August 1946) is a former professional tennis player from Argentina.

Biography
Ganzábal first played Davis Cup tennis for Argentina in 1967. His career singles highlights include winning the River Plate Championships four times (1968-69, 1973, 1976). 

He defeated two-time Grand Slam winner Fred Stolle at Gstaad in 1969, but didn't go deep into a Grand Prix tournament until 1972 when he reached the semifinals at home in Buenos Aires. Further semifinals came at Florence in 1974 and Berlin in 1976. As a doubles player he partnered with Davis Cup teammate Lito Álvarez to finish runner-up at Hilversum in 1974. They were beaten in the final by the Argentine pair of Tito Vázquez and Guillermo Vilas. 

At his best on clay, Ganzábal reached the third round of the 1976 French Open, his best performance in a Grand Slam tournament. Soon after the French Open, he reached his highest career ranking of 68 in the world.

Ganzábal ended his Davis Cup career in 1975 after 13 ties for his country. He finished with a 16-9 record overall, which included 14 singles wins.

Following retirement, he trained his younger brother Alejandro Ganzábal, who was also a professional tennis player. The brothers became major investors in Argentina's real estate industry.

Grand Prix career finals

Doubles: 1 (0–1)

See also
List of Argentina Davis Cup team representatives

References

External links
 
 
 

1946 births
Living people
Argentine male tennis players
Tennis players from Buenos Aires
Argentine businesspeople